Eric Koester is an American professor from Georgetown University.

Early life and education
Koester was born in Beaumont, Texas, before his family moved to Omaha, Nebraska, when he was one. He started MEGO Consulting, his first company in 1992 and began publishing research and consulting reports, including his first book on plastics recycling for Mastio & Associates in 1994. He completed a BS in Finance & Marketing from Marquette University. He received his Juris Doctor from George Washington University Law School in Washington DC.

Career
Koester started his career at Ventana Medical Systems, which Roche bought for $3.4 billion in 2008. In 2006, Koester joined Cooley LLP as a corporate securities attorney, especially for their emerging firms and venture capital practice.

In 2010, he joined the cloud marketing firm Appature as its director of operations and general counsel, and in 2011, he co-founded Zaarly with Bo Fishback and Ian Hunter. Among the investors in Zaarly were Ashton Kutcher, Meg Whitman, CEO of eBay, and Kleiner Perkins.

In 2013, he co-founded Main Street Genome with Scott Case (acquired in 2015). He was also appointed as the managing director of NextGen Venture Partners.

In 2013, Georgetown University recruited Koester as a Professor of Entrepreneurship and Innovation.

Koester runs Manuscripts which provides author-centric publishing services, including author and creator educational and support programs. He has helped thousands of individuals, with his course named 2018's Most Innovative by USASBE.

His Book Creators community program has helped more than 1,500 first-time writers develop and publish their first books, and has generated more than fifty national book prize winners or finalists in 2020-2022.

Awards and recognition
 Honored with the Forbes Next Top 1000 entrepreneurs of 2021
 Koester was named one of the 40 under 40 for Washington DC in 2012 by the Washington Business Journal.
 In 2009, Koester was named the Young Attorney of the Year by the Washington State Bar Association
 Named one of DCA Live’s 40 Under 40
 Bisnow - 40 under 40
 USASBE 2020 Entrepreneurship Educator of the Year
 Honored with Georgetown's only two-time entrepreneurship professor of the year.
 Named to Inc. 5000, #5 Fastest Growing Education Company as Founder of Manuscripts

Books

References

Living people
American academics
1977 births
People from Beaumont, Texas
People from Omaha, Nebraska
Georgetown University faculty
Marquette University alumni
George Washington University Law School alumni